The 1987 Calder Cup playoffs of the American Hockey League began on April 8, 1987. The eight teams that qualified, four from each division, played best-of-seven series for Division Semifinals and Division Finals. The division champions played a best-of-seven series for the Calder Cup.  The Calder Cup Final ended on May 23, 1987, with the Rochester Americans defeating the Sherbrooke Canadiens four games to three to win the Calder Cup for the fifth time in team history. Rochester's Dave Fenyves won the Jack A. Butterfield Trophy as AHL playoff MVP.

Sherbrooke set an AHL record for goals scored in one playoff with 85. The Cape Breton Oilers tied this record in 1993.

Playoff seeds
After the 1986–87 AHL regular season, the top four teams from each division qualified for the playoffs. The Sherbrooke Canadiens finished the regular season with the best overall record.

Northern Division
Sherbrooke Canadiens - 102 points
Adirondack Red Wings - 93 points
Moncton Golden Flames - 92 points
Nova Scotia Oilers - 79 points

Southern Division
Rochester Americans - 101 points
Binghamton Whalers - 101 points
New Haven Nighthawks - 99 points
Hershey Bears - 87 points

Bracket

In each round, the team that earned more points during the regular season receives home ice advantage, meaning they receive the "extra" game on home-ice if the series reaches the maximum number of games. There is no set series format due to arena scheduling conflicts and travel considerations.

Division Semifinals 
Note: Home team is listed first.

Northern Division

(1) Sherbrooke Canadiens vs. (4) Nova Scotia Oilers

(2) Adirondack Red Wings vs. (3) Moncton Golden Flames

Southern Division

(1) Rochester Americans vs. (4) Hershey Bears

(2) Binghamton Whalers vs. (3) New Haven Nighthawks

Division Finals

Northern Division

(1) Sherbrooke Canadiens vs. (2) Adirondack Red Wings

Southern Division

(1) Rochester Americans vs. (2) Binghamton Whalers

Calder Cup Final

(N1) Sherbrooke Canadiens vs. (S1) Rochester Americans

See also
1986–87 AHL season
List of AHL seasons

References

Calder Cup
Calder Cup playoffs